Peter Flanders is a former Australian rugby league player. A fullback, he appeared in 33 matches for the Western Suburbs between 1969 and 1971. He subsequently played for the Eastern Suburbs during the 1972 NSWRFL season.

References

Year of birth missing
Australian rugby league players
Rugby league fullbacks
Sydney Roosters players
Western Suburbs Magpies players